Faten Hammami is a Tunisian freestyle wrestler. She represented Tunisia at the 2019 African Games held in Rabat, Morocco and she won the bronze medal in the 53 kg event.

In 2019, she also won the gold medal in the 55 kg event at the African Wrestling Championships held in Hammamet, Tunisia.

She won the silver medal in her event at the 2022 African Wrestling Championships held in El Jadida, Morocco.

Achievements

References

External links 
 

Living people
Year of birth missing (living people)
Place of birth missing (living people)
Tunisian female sport wrestlers
Competitors at the 2019 African Games
African Games bronze medalists for Tunisia
African Games medalists in wrestling
African Wrestling Championships medalists
21st-century Tunisian women